Siamusotima disrupta is a species of stem-boring moth of the family Crambidae first described by Maria Alma Solis et al. in 2017.

References

Musotiminae
Moths described in 2017